Carbonear Bay is a natural bay off the island of Newfoundland located in the province of Newfoundland and Labrador, Canada. The bay is also home to Carbonear Island.

References

Bays of Newfoundland and Labrador